The list of ship launches in 1819 includes a chronological list of ships launched in 1819.


See also

References

1819
Ship launches